Xonqa District (/Хонқа тумани, خانقە تۇمەنى) is a district of Xorazm Region in Uzbekistan. The capital lies at the town Xonqa. The district consists of 5 urban-type settlements (Xonqa, Istiqlol, Madaniy yer, Birlashgan, Yosh kuch) and 10 rural communities.

References

Xorazm Region
Districts of Uzbekistan